Federal attorney may refer to:

In the United States, 

United States Attorney, who represent the government in US federal courts
Licensed federal attorney, who are licensed to appear in federal courts

See also